Alexander Keith Marshall (February 11, 1808 – April 28, 1884) was an American physician who became aligned with the Know Nothing Party (sometimes called the "American party") and served as single term as United States Representative from Kentucky.

Early and family life

He was born at Buck Pond, near Versailles, Woodford County, Kentucky. His father Louis Marshall was a younger brother of U.S. Supreme Court Chief Justice John Marshall, and himself served as president of several universities. His eldest brother Thomas Francis Marshall (1801-1864) served in the Kentucky legislature and U.S. House of Representatives in 1841-1843 (before their mother's death). Another brother, William Louis Marshall (1803-1879) became a major with the Maryland Volunteers during the American Civil War but survived the conflict and moved to California where he later died. Their youngest brother Edward Colston Marshall (1821-1893), also became a U.S. Congressman (from a California district 1851-1853) after serving in the U.S. Army during the Mexican War, then remained loyal to the Union during the American Civil War and served as California's Attorney General (1883-1887). Their sister Agatha Madison Marshall Logan (1818-1858) married Caleb Wallace Logan, the son of attorney and U.S. Senator William Harrison Logan, and who bore five daughters before her death.

After a private education appropriate to his class, Marshall settled in Nicholasville, the county seat of Jessamine County in the center of the state. Studying medicine, he graduated from the medical department of the University of Pennsylvania in Philadelphia in 1844.

Personal life

Marshall married and had at least one son, Louis C. Marshall (1835-1908) who remained in Lexington.

Career

Marshall practiced medicine at Nicholasville, Kentucky.

Marshall was a member of the Kentucky constitutional convention held in Frankfort, Kentucky in 1849. He became a member of the Know Nothing Party and was elected as a candidate of the American Party to the Thirty-fourth Congress (March 4, 1855 – March 3, 1857), succeeding John C. Breckinridge (who had been elected to the U.S. Senate). However, he only served a single term, losing to attorney James B. Clay, son of Kentucky's Henry Clay. by the 1850 census, he was living in a boarding house in Jessamine County and characterized himself as a "mail contractor." Dr. Marshall then moved to Missouri, but returned to Kentucky and settled in Fayette County where he resumed his medical practice as well as farmed.

Death and legacy

Marshall died near East Hickman, Fayette County, Kentucky in 1884 and was interred at Lexington Cemetery, as would be his son Louis decades later.

References

1808 births
1884 deaths
People from Woodford County, Kentucky
Know-Nothing members of the United States House of Representatives from Kentucky
Kentucky Know Nothings
Physicians from Kentucky
Perelman School of Medicine at the University of Pennsylvania alumni
19th-century American politicians
Activists from Kentucky
Members of the United States House of Representatives from Kentucky